Stuck in the Suburbs is a Disney Channel Original Movie. It was released on July 16, 2004, and stars Danielle Panabaker as Brittany Aarons and Brenda Song as Natasha Kwon-Schwartz. Brittany, a regular middle school student in the suburbs, accidentally exchanges cell phones with pop singer Jordan Cahill. This was one of the first Television films by Disney which was also accompanied by its own soundtrack. The film gathered 3.7 million viewers which made the film the most-watched telecast in its time period in the kids 6–11 and 9–14 demographics. The film's soundtrack entered the U.S. Billboard 200 and peaked at #5 on the Billboard Top Kid Audio charts.

Plot
Brittany Aarons (Danielle Panabaker) is a regular teenage girl, one of the many who has a crush on popular pop singer Jordan Cahill (Taran Killam). However, she is bored of living a suburban existence and pines for excitement. At school, she meets a new girl, Natasha Kwon-Schwartz (Brenda Song), who informs Brittany that she moved to suburbia from several years on and off living in Europe and New York. Brittany's other friends dislike Natasha for her nonconformism, but Brittany pursues a friendship with her. Upon finding out that Jordan is filming a video nearby, Brittany invites Natasha to join her and her fangirl friends to watch the shoot. Jordan, at the video shoot, expresses dislike for the shallow new single, wanting to sing his own lyrics, which his record company denies him. When Jordan and his team knock into Brittany and Natasha after the shoot, Eddie (Jordan's assistant, best friend and confidante) and Brittany accidentally pick up one another's phones in the ensuing mess.

Brittany tries to return "Eddie's" phone but is denied entry at Jordan's hotel. Once they get a hold of Eddie and figure out the phone is Jordan's, they demand to speak with the pop star before they would return it, which Eddie refuses.  Natasha convinces Brittany that it would be fun to mess with Jordan, and change his image. They prank call his hair stylist, get her to cut off all his hair, and get a new wardrobe for him. Along the way they find that Jordan's life is not the life he chooses, but rather the one his record company wants for him. At first he is terrified that his personal barber gave him a major haircut, but eventually accepts it as the first step towards a break from his manufactured image, enjoying his new wardrobe and look, which he thinks Eddie procured. Eventually, the girls demand Eddie have Jordan perform at a rally hosted by Brittany's mother to save a local landmark, which was previously failing to draw attention.

Jordan gets a hold of Brittany after Eddie confesses to the whole situation, and Jordan explains everything to her. She and Natasha make up from a falling out, and go to meet up with him while being chased by the record company who are tracking his phone.  They send his lyrics for one of his songs "More Than Me" to everyone through Brittany's phone, ditch his phone and get a ride to the rally with Brittany's sister.  At the rally, Eddie tries to stop Jordan from appearing but ultimately supports him, and the landmark is preserved. Brittany, Natasha, and Brittany's fangirl friends become dancers in the music video he was making at the beginning of the movie, which now features Eddie replacing Jordan. It is shown that Brittany and Jordan keep in touch, and although he invites her to go to New York with him (over the phone), she declines, saying things are really exciting in her suburban town.

Cast

Production
The film was mostly shot on several locations throughout the Greater New Orleans Area, in particular St. Tammany Parish. The school scenes were filmed in the atrium, front steps, and the courtyard of Ben Franklin High School in the Lakefront area. Lockers were temporarily moved into the atrium to give the appearance of a hallway, and door frames were painted with temporary red paint.

The music video for "Make a Wish" was filmed in Carousel Gardens Amusement Park in New Orleans. The other video for "More Than Me" is filmed at the Piazza d'Italia in Downtown New Orleans.

The "Old House" from the film is actually the Otis House from Fairview-Riverside State Park in Madisonville on the Northshore. The house was aged for production, but restored to its actual appearance at the end of the film. The Otis House was originally built in the 1880s, has been on the National Register of Historic Places since 1998, and it actually is located near the expanding suburb of Mandeville. When Brittany is riding through the suburbs on her bike she is actually riding through Lafreniere Park.

Reception and ratings
The film received 3.7 million viewers at its TV premiere, including top rankings in the time period in the kids 6–11 and 9–14 demographics.

Soundtrack

Walt Disney Records released a soundtrack for the album to promote the television movie with the original movie promotional poster. The songs below are included in the first edition of the soundtrack: Taran Killam who played Jordan Cahill confirmed on social media that he did not sing in the film. Singer and actor Drew Seeley (who had a brief role in the film) sang in place of Killam. Seeley also sang for Zac Efron 2 years later for High School Musical.

Songs
"A Whatever Life" – Haylie Duff
"Good Life" – Jesse McCartney
"Stuck" – Stacie Orrico
"Over It" – Anneliese van der Pol
"Stuck in the Middle With You" – Stealers Wheel
"Take Me Back Home" – Greg Raposo
"More Than Me" (Acoustic) – Jordan Cahill
"On Top of the World" – Jordan Cahill
"Make a Wish" – Jordan Cahill
"More Than Me" (Pop Version) – Jordan Cahill
 "Fade Away" - Whitney Minson

Collectors edition
The enhanced golden collectors edition included the following songs with the same promotional movie poster:

"A Whatever Life" Remix – Haylie Duff
"Good Life" (Acoustic) – Jesse McCartney
"Stuck" – Stacie Orrico
"Over It" Remix – Anneliese van der Pol
"Stuck in the Middle With You" – Stealers Wheel
"Take Me Back Home" – Greg Raposo
"More Than Me" (Acoustic) – Jordan Cahill / Taran Killam
"On Top of the World" – Jordan Cahill / Taran Killam
"Make a Wish" – Jordan Cahill / Taran Killam
"More Than Me" (Pop Version) – Jordan Cahill / Taran Killam

Contributions
"Good Life" and "Over It" was featured in several DisneyMania and Walt Disney Records albums and complaition soundtracks. "More Than Me" by Jordan Cahill / Taran Killam was featured in The Suite Life of Zack & Cody and Haylie Duff's "A Whatever Life" was in 7th Heaven.

Charts

References

External links

 

2004 comedy-drama films
2004 films
2004 television films
American children's films
American comedy-drama films
American musical drama films
American teen comedy films
Disney Channel Original Movie films
Films about music and musicians
Films directed by Savage Steve Holland
Films scored by David Kitay
Films set in Louisiana
Films shot in New Orleans
2000s English-language films
2000s American films